Xerocrassa rhithymna is a species of air-breathing land snail, a pulmonate gastropod mollusk in the family Geomitridae.

Distribution

This species is endemic to Greece, where it is restricted to the northern part of the island of Crete, between the Lefka Ori and the Psiloriti mountains.

See also
List of non-marine molluscs of Greece

References

 Bank, R. A.; Neubert, E. (2017). Checklist of the land and freshwater Gastropoda of Europe. Last update: July 16th, 2017

Further reading

rhithymna
Molluscs of Europe
Endemic fauna of Crete
Gastropods described in 2009
Taxobox binomials not recognized by IUCN